Neil S. Sullivan (born January 18, 1942) is a professor of physics at the University of Florida. 

He attended Otago University, where he received a Bachelor of Science degree in physics in 1964 followed by a Master of Science in 1965. In 1972, he obtained his PhD from Harvard University with the thesis Nuclear Magnetism of Solid Hydrogen at Low Temperatures.

Born in New Zealand, Sullivan became a naturalized United States citizen in 2004.

Career
Sullivan became a professor of physics at the University of Florida in 1983. He became chair of the Physics Department in 1989, a position he held until 1999. It was during this time that he was one of three lead collaborators to successfully propose the creation of the National High Magnetic Field Laboratory in Tallahassee, Florida. 
From 2000-2006, he served as Dean of the College of Liberal Arts and Sciences. He is also one of the editors-in-chief of the Journal of Low Temperature Physics.

In 1987 he was elected a Fellow of the American Physical Society, his citation reading "for fundamental studies of quantum solids using NMR techniques: contributions to orientational transitions in adsorbed N2 and solid hydrogen, discovery of a quadrupolar glass state in hydrogen, and elucidation of vacancies in solid 3He"

References

External links

1942 births
Living people
University of Florida faculty
University of Otago alumni
Harvard University alumni
American people of New Zealand descent
Fellows of the American Physical Society